XHARZ-FM is a noncommercial regional Mexican radio station on 100.1 FM in Aguascalientes, Aguascalientes, Mexico. The station is known as La Sanmarqueña.

References

Radio stations in Aguascalientes
Mass media in Aguascalientes City
Radio stations established in 1999
1999 establishments in Mexico